Hume's boobook or Hume's hawk-owl (Ninox obscura) is a species of owl in the family Strigidae endemic to the Andaman Islands. Its natural habitats are subtropical or tropical moist lowland forests and subtropical or tropical mangrove forests. It is becoming rare due to habitat loss.

Gallery

References

Hume's hawk-owl
Birds of the Andaman Islands
Hume's boobook